John Malcolm Swales (born 1938) is a linguist best known for his work on genre analysis, particularly with regard to its application to the fields of rhetoric, discourse analysis, English for Academic Purposes and, more recently, information science.

Biography 
He was born in 1938 in Reigate, in the south of England, and attended various private schools before going up to Queens' College, Cambridge in 1957, graduating with a degree in psychology. He first taught in southern Italy for two years, both in a high school and at the local university, and then went to Sweden for a year as an English language teacher. His next move was as an Assistant Lecturer at the University of Libya from 1963-65. After a year studying for an advanced diploma in linguistics and English language teaching at the University of Leeds, UK he returned to Libya as Head of the English Section at the College of Engineering in Tripoli. After three more years at the Leeds Institute of Education, he returned to the Middle East, this time to the prestigious University of Khartoum, Sudan, where he was Director of the English Language Servicing Unit from 1973-1978. He returned to the UK in 1978 as a senior lecturer (later reader) in the Language Studies Unit at the University of Aston, where he jointly developed the first master’s course in the teaching of English for Specific Purposes.

In 1985 he moved to the University of Michigan on a visiting position and in 1987 was appointed Professor of Linguistics. He was appointed Director of the English Language Institute from 1985 to 2001. He retired in 2007, but remains Professor Emeritus of Linguistics and an active scholar. His writing on topics such as the concept of discourse community, the relating of descriptive linguistic research to pedagogical uptake, and the design of materials for advanced learners of English, has been influential in many countries around the world. In particular, his analysis of research article introductions (known as the CARS Model, short for "Creating A Research Space") has been widely adopted and extended. In more recent years, John Swales has been closely involved with two corpus projects at the English Language Institute at the University of Michigan: MICASE (The Michigan Corpus of Academic Spoken English) and MICUSP (The Michigan Corpus of Upper Level Student Papers). He has honorary doctoral degrees from Uppsala University (2004) and the University of Silesia (2015).

Overall, he has written or co-written twenty books and about 130 research articles or book chapters. He continues to be frequently invited to be a keynote speaker at conferences around the world. A partial list of his book-length publications follows.

Selected publications
That's One Good Thing About Dictators!: My Experience in Libya (Oxford: Pergamon Press, 1969)
Episodes in ESP (Oxford: Pergamon Press, 1985)
Genre Analysis: English in Academic and Research Settings (Cambridge, 1990)
Other Floors, Other Voices: A Textography of a Small University Building (Erlbaum, 1998)
English in Today’s Research World: A Writing Guide (with C. B. Feak) (University of Michigan Press, 2000)
Academic Writing for Graduate Students, 2nd Ed. (with C. B. Feak) (Michigan, 2004)
Research Genres: Explorations and Applications (Cambridge, 2004)
Telling a Research Story: Writing a Literature Review (with C. B. Feak) (Michigan, 2009)
Abstracts and the Writing of Abstracts (with C. B. Feak) (Michigan, 2009)
Incidents in an Educational Life: A Memoir (of sorts) (Michigan, 2009)
Aspects of Article Introductions (Michigan, 2011)
Navigating Academia: Writing Supporting Genres (with C. B. Feak) (Michigan, 2011)
Creating Contexts: Writing Introductions Across Genres (with C. B. Feak) (Michigan, 2011)
Academic Writing for Graduate Students, 3rd Ed. (with C. B. Feak) (Michigan, 2012)
Reflections on the concept of discourse community (ASp, n. 69, 2016)
Other Floors, Other Voices: A Textography of a Small University Building, Twentieth Anniversary Ed. (University of Michigan Press, 2018)

References

External links

 Keynote YouTube talk on Genre and English for Academic Purposes
 list of his publications as of 2008, in a special issue in honor of him, see English for Specific Purposes 27 (2008) 130–142 doi:10.1016/j.esp.2007.10.003

1938 births
People from Surrey
Living people
Alumni of Queens' College, Cambridge
Academic staff of the University of Libya
Academic staff of the University of Khartoum
Academics of Aston University
University of Michigan faculty
Date of birth missing (living people)